Osa  is a village in northern Poland, in the administrative district of Gmina Mikołajki, within Mrągowo County, Warmian-Masurian Voivodeship.

References

Osa